Star Wars: Uprising was an action role-playing game by Kabam and published by Disney Interactive Studios for iOS and Android. It was released on September 10, 2015.  On September 22, 2016, it was announced that all servers would be shutting down on November 17, 2016.

Plot
Set shortly after the events of Return of the Jedi, Imperial Governor Adelhard of the Anoat Sector refuses to release his grip, instead locking down the sector to prevent all incoming and outgoing space traffic to keep everyone within and allow him to maintain an iron rule. He refuses to accept the death of Darth Vader and Palpatine as the fall of the Empire, keeping Palpatine's death under wraps. As the Rebel Alliance only has a small presence in the sector, smugglers, assassins, crime lords, nobles and crime cartels form their own rebellion against Adelhard.

Characters

Gameplay
Players were able to create avatars and were able to purchase skills and upgrades. They could amass a crew to assist them in battles. The game could be played by up to four players. Playable classes included the Smuggler, Bounty Hunter, Rebel Guerilla, Diplomat, Gambler.

Reception
It has a score of 65% on Metacritic. Pocket Gamer awarded it 6 out of 10, saying "There's nothing really wrong with it, but if you were hoping for a Star Wars mobile game with a little more bite than the usual card battlers and tower defence titles, you're going to come away disappointed." IGN awarded it a score of 5.5 out of 10, saying "Star Wars: Uprising boils down to the pursuit of upgradeable stuff administered through simple action and scant story."

References

External links

2015 video games
Star Wars video games
Multiplayer and single-player video games
Space opera video games
Action role-playing video games
Android (operating system) games
IOS games
Disney video games
Video games developed in Canada
Kabam games